Grantsburg Municipal Airport  is a public use airport located two nautical miles (3.7 km) northeast of the central business district of Grantsburg, a village in Burnett County, Wisconsin, United States. It is owned by the Village of Grantsburg.

It is included in the Federal Aviation Administration (FAA) National Plan of Integrated Airport Systems for 2021–2025, in which it is categorized as a basic general aviation facility.

Facilities and aircraft 
It has two runways: 12/30 is 2,999 by 60 feet (914 x 18 m) with an asphalt pavement, and both GPS and VOR/DME approaches; 5/23 is 3,280 by 120 feet (1,000 x 37 m) with a turf surface.

For the 12-month period ending September 23, 2021, the airport had 1,620 aircraft operations, an average of 4 per day: 93% general aviation, 6% air taxi and 1% military. In January 2023, there were 13 aircraft based at this airport: all 13 single-engine.

See also
List of airports in Wisconsin

References

External links 
 Grantsburg Municipal Airport (GTG) at Wisconsin DOT airport directory
 

Airports in Wisconsin
Buildings and structures in Burnett County, Wisconsin